Shalonda Enis (born December 3, 1974) is a former professional basketball player who played for the Washington Mystics and Charlotte Sting of the WNBA.

Biography
Enis started playing basketball at age 12 at her middle school in Celeste, Texas. In her junior and senior years she helped lead Celeste High School to consecutive state titles. At the conclusion of her senior year she was the all-time leading scorer in Texas high school basketball history. She attended two colleges. First, she attended Trinity Valley Community College (TVCC) and helped lead the women's basketball team to the National Junior College Athletic Association championship in the 1993–94 season. She left TVCC as its all-time leader in career shots made (326) and season shots made (194). She later transferred to University of Alabama.

Alabama statistics
Source

WNBA
Enis played for the Washington Mystics and Charlotte Sting, a total of 106 games in five seasons. She re-signed with the Sting in 2005, but never played a regular season game.

Awards and honors

College
Texas Eastern Conference Newcomer of the Year (1993)
Texas Eastern Conference Most Valuable Player award (1994)
Kodak All-American and Women's Basketball 
News Service All-American
All-Conference First Team for her junior and senior years
MVP of the 1994 Women's U.S. Olympic Festival
Associated Press All-American Third Team

American Basketball League
MVP of the 1998 All-Star Game 
Second-team All-ABL and Rookie of the Year by the national media.

Personal life
Enis has three sons, Chanse, Chase. and Chayton.

References

External links
Washingtonpost.com: Enis Enjoying Her Rise Through the Pro Ranks
Shalonda Enis Enis Intends To Get A National Title For The Crimson Tide, And Many Miles Away Her Biggest Little Fan Will Be Cheering. - SI.com

1974 births
Living people
Alabama Crimson Tide women's basketball players
All-American college women's basketball players
Basketball players from Texas
Centers (basketball)
Charlotte Sting players
People from Celeste, Texas
Power forwards (basketball)
Trinity Valley Cardinals women's basketball players
Washington Mystics draft picks
Washington Mystics players